The 1919 Williams Ephs football team represented Williams College as an independent during the 1919 college football season. Led by second-year head coach Joseph W. Brooks, the Ephs compiled a record of 6–2.

Schedule

References

Williams
Williams Ephs football seasons
Williams Ephs football